William Lawrence Nagle (4 June 1947 – 5 March 2002) was an Australian soldier, author, actor, and screenwriter. His first book, The Odd Angry Shot, written after his return from the Vietnam War and exit from the army,
traced the lives of a group of Australian soldiers from their departure from Australia, their rotation in South Vietnam, and return to Australia. The book was made into a movie of the same name released in 1979

Military service
Nagle enlisted in the Australian Regular Army on 31 August 1964, as Private Nagle 38359.
After initial infantry training he attended the Army Basic Cooking Course in January 1965, qualifying as a cook in May 1965, and was assigned to the Australian Army Catering Corps (AACC).

In March 1966 he was reassigned to the SAS Regiment as cook. After attending the Cadre Course and qualifying in Navigation and Parachuting in April, Nagle was detached, in June 1966, to  Squadron, deploying on 15 June from RAAF Base Richmond to Saigon, South Vietnam.

While in Vietnam, Nagle was found to have "Disobeyed a lawful command - Refused to cook egg custard", and was given fourteen days punishment and forfeiture of pay.

On 18 March 1967 Nagle returned to Australia from South Vietnam. At his request he was transferred from AACC to Royal Australian Infantry, in April 1967, where he was posted as a signaller. He was discharged from the Army on 12 September 1968 at his own request.

Books and screenplays
 The Siege of Firebase Gloria - Screenplay, with Tony Johnston. Also known as Forward Firebase Gloria. Publisher: International Film Management, 1987. Length 250 pages. Subjects: Tet Offensive, 1968. Vietnam War, 1961–1975
 The Odd Angry Shot - Book.
 Death of a Soldier - Screenplay.

References

External links
 Vietnam Service: http://www.vietnamroll.gov.au/Certificate.aspx?VeteranId=1276943
 Obituary: http://www.frontiersmen.org.au/nagle.htm

1947 births
2002 deaths
Australian military personnel of the Vietnam War
Australian soldiers